Nittur is a village in the Siruguppa taluk of Bellary district in Karnataka state, India.

Importance
Nittur is famous for the minor edict of the emperor Ashoka found in the village.

See also
Bellary
Maski
Siruguppa
Tekkalakote

References

Villages in Bellary district
History of Karnataka
Archaeological sites in Karnataka